Alpha-S1-casein is a protein that in humans is encoded by the CSN1S1 gene.

Interactions
CSN1S1 has been shown to interact with SAP130.

References

External links

Further reading